Negromantis milloti is a species of praying mantis found in Madagascar.

See also
List of mantis genera and species

References

Nanomantidae
Insects of Madagascar